Dead Souls, is a 1909 Russian short comedy directed and written by Pyotr Chardynin.

Plot 
The film is based on the novel "Dead Souls" by Nikolay Gogol.

Starring 
 Ivan Kamsky as Chichikov
 Vasili Stepanov as Sobakevich
 Antonina Pozharskaya as Plyushkin's cook
 Pyotr Chardynin as Nozdrev
 Aleksandra Goncharova as A quite simply pleasant lady
 L. Khrapovitskaya as A lady who is pleasant in all respects
 Ivan Potyomkin as Petrushka

References

External links 
 

1909 films
1900s Russian-language films
1909 short films
Russian silent short films
Russian black-and-white films
Films of the Russian Empire
1909 comedy films
Russian comedy short films
Silent comedy films